Dr. Veditantirige Eustace Reginold de Silva (later became Veditantirige Ediriweera Ranjitha Sarachchandra) (3 June 1914 – 16 August 1996; Sinhala: මහාචාර්ය එදිරිවීර සරච්චන්ද්‍ර), popularly as Ediriweera Sarachchandra, was a Sri Lankan playwright, novelist, poet, literary critic, essayist and social commentator. Considered as the premier playwright in Sri Lanka, Sarachchandra produced several critically acclaimed theater plays in a career spanned for more than four decades. He also served as a senior lecturer at the University of Peradeniya for many years and as Sri Lankan Ambassador to France from 1974 to 1977.

Personal life
Sarachchandra was born on 3 June 1914 in Dodanduwa, Rathgama, Galle, Sri Lanka. He completed his early education at Richmond College in Galle, St. John's College Panadura, S. Thomas' College, Mount Lavinia and St. Aloysius' College in Galle.

In 1939 Sarachchandra married Aileen Beleth. Then he married Lalitha Swarna Perera, a children's drama producer. Sarachchandra was the father of five children: Nanaditha, Sunethra, Kisagothami, Yashodhara and Ransi. His daughter Sunethra is also a popular actress in cinema, television and theater who entered acting with his father's stage play Kapuwa Kapothii. Her performance in Ves Muhunu made her the best actress. Since then, she has received several state awards.

Teaching career
Sarachchandra started his career as a teacher at St. Peter's College in Colombo 4. He then joined the publishing company Lake House in an administrative position. 1933, gained admission to the Ceylon University College and offered Pali, Sanskrit and Sinhala for the first degree and passed out in 1936 with a first class and sat for the Ceylon Civil Service examination (because of his parents insistence) and came first in the island.

He subsequently travelled to Santiniketan to study Indian philosophy and Music. Sarachchandra returned to Sri Lanka in 1940 and resumed his teaching career at St. Thomas College in Mt. Lavinia. From 1942 to 1944 he worked on his master's degree in Indian philosophy as an external student of the University of London while holding the position of Sub-Editor of the Sinhala Dictionary. Sarachchandra returned to the University of Ceylon serving as a lecturer in Pali from 1947 to 1949. He gained entry to the University of London in 1949 to study towards a post graduate degree in Western Philosophy.

Career
Sarachchandra entered the drama around 1940 as a playwright who followed the Western natural drama tradition. For the next ten years or so, he was involved in Western natural drama adapted into Sinhala. During that time, he made the stage plays Mudalalige Peraliya (1943), Kapuwa Kapoti (1945), Hangi Hora (1949), Valaha, Magul Prasthava and Manager (1950) which were adaptive natural dramas produced by him. In 1951, he produced the play Bahina Kalawa which was his first naturalistic creation. Then he made three independent, natural short plays: Vala Ihagena Kema, Tharuna Lekakaya and Sathwa Karunawa. In 1955, he made his longest natural drama Wadinna Giya Devale, which is a semi-natural drama with two songs based on a golden folk tale.

Sarachchandra's concept of drama had undergone a major transformation since the early 1950s. In 1952, he produced a semi-natural semi-stylized play Pabawathi which was the first step he took to create a local drama tradition. It was the first time that his play has included "Pothe Gura" and songs. Later, he had the opportunity to study in Eastern countries such as India and Japan. After returning, he produced his first stylist play Maname in 1956 to widespread acclaim. Maname is generally considered the first real Sinhala drama, signalling the transition from the Nadagam or folk drama to the modern theatrical drama format. After the successful venture, he continued as a playwright, developing his next stylist play Sinhabahu in 1961, which is widely considered as his best work. Based on the Nadagam tradition, he produced only these two plays.

After those critically acclaimed plays, he made several beyond 'Nadagam' tradition dramas including: Kada Walalu (1958), Elova Gihin Melova Ava (1959), Hasthikantha Manthare (1959), Mahasara (1968), Prematho Jayathi Soko (1969), Wesasanthara Natakaya (1980), Lomahansa Natakaya (1958), Bhava Kadathurava (1988). Most of his plays were adaptations from Buddhist Jathakas or Sinhala folklore giving his work instant and lasting popularity with the population that identified with their roots. He followed a stylistic tradition that included singing, playing and dancing in these stage plays. Composed and first produced in 1969, the lyric drama Pematho Jayathi Soko was based on the classic poetry "Swarnathilaka" included in "Saddharmalankaraya". It was first presented by the Sinhala Drama Board of the University of Ceylon, Peradeniya and was staged for a week from February 25, 1969 to March 2, 1969 at 8 pm at the Sukhawathie Theater (EOE Perera Theater) in the Engineering Department of the University.

The University of Jaffna and the University of Peradeniya conferred Sarachchandra the degree of Doctor of Literature in 1982. Also in that year he was made an Emeritus Professor at the University of Peradeniya. In 1983 the State of Kerala in South India awarded Sarachchandra the Kumaran Asan World Prize. In 1988 he won the Ramon Magsaysay Award for Literature. On 3 June 2014, Sarachchandra's birth centenary falls which has been recognized by UNESCO. With that, he became the first and only Sri Lankan artist to be recognized by UNESCO.

Stage plays
Bahina Kalawa
Bhavakaḍaturāwa
Elowa gihin Melowa Āwā
Kada Walalu
Kirimuttiya Gangea Giya – 1985
Lomahansa
Mahasara
Maname
Mudalalige Peraliya
Pabāvatī
Pematho Jayathi Soko
Raththaran
Sinhabāhu
Wessantara

Author works

Novels
Malagiya Eththo (1959)
Walmath Wee Hasarak Nudutimi (1962)
Malwunge Awrudhuda (1965)
Loku Putha Nohoth Bandulage Parawarthaya (1971)
Heta Echchara Kaluwara Ne (1975)
Wilasiniyakage Premaya (1988)
Curfew and a Full Moon (1978)
With the Begging Bowl (1986)
Foam Upon the Stream (1987)

Short Stories
Kalayage Awemen (1969)
Maya Roopaya (1974)
Roopa Sundari (1984)
Midiya, Gruhaniya ha Upasikawa (1993)
Of a Queen and a Courtesan (1970)
The Death of a Friend (1981)

Research, Literary Theory and Criticism
Sahithya Vidyawa (1949)
Sinhala Nawakatha Ithihasaya ha Wicharaya (1951)
Kalpana Lokaya (1958)
Natya Gaweshana (1967)
Wes Muhunuda Sebe Muhunuda? (1971)
Modern Sinhalese Fiction (1943)
The Sinhalese Novel (1950)
The folk Drama of Ceylon (1952)
Buddhist Psychology of Perception (1958)

Other
Ape Withthi (1942)
Asampurna Charika Satahan (1967)
Dharmishta Samajaya (1982)
Pin Ethi Sarasawi Waramak Denne (1985)

See also

Theatre of Sri Lanka
Sri Lankan Non Career Diplomats

References

External links
Sarachchandra Org
The 1988 Ramon Magsaysay Award for Journalism, Literature and Creative Communication Arts, CITATION for Veditantirige Ediriwara Sarachchandra
SYMPOSIUM: SRI LANKA'S CULTURAL EXPERIENCE Between Home and the World
Sarachchandra the diplomat – a few recollections
  Integral dramatist, doyen among intellectuals
Professor Ediriweera Sarachchandra
සරච්චන්ද්‍ර හිටියානම් අද මොනවා කියයිද?

1914 births
1996 deaths
Sinhalese academics
Sri Lankan dramatists and playwrights
Sri Lankan novelists
Alumni of University of London Worldwide
Alumni of the University of London
Alumni of the Ceylon University College
Alumni of Richmond College, Galle
Alumni of St. Aloysius' College, Galle
Alumni of St. John's College, Panadura
Alumni of S. Thomas' College, Mount Lavinia
Academic staff of the University of Ceylon (Colombo)
Academic staff of the University of Ceylon (Peradeniya)
Ambassadors of Sri Lanka to France
Sinhala-language poets
Sinhalese writers
People from Galle
20th-century novelists
20th-century poets
20th-century dramatists and playwrights
Sri Lankan academics
Academics from Galle